Leptodeuterocopus gratus is a moth of the family Pterophoridae that is known from Peru.

Adults are on wing in March.

External links

Deuterocopinae
Moths described in 1921
Endemic fauna of Peru
Moths of South America